Alexandros Karagiannis (born 25 October 1993) is a Greek professional footballer who plays as a winger for Kozani.

Club career

Aris
He started his career in Pyrsos Grevena, In July 2010 he transferred to Aris Thessaloniki's U18 team. During the 2012–2013 season, then head coach Makis Katsavakis promoted him to the first team, though he made his debut in December 2012 in a match against Xanthi, after Lucas Alcaraz was appointed as manager.

Chania
On 25 July 2014, he signed a year contract with Chania.

Lamia
On 11 August 2015, he signed with Lamia for an undisclosed fee. In the 2016–17 season he celebrated promotion to the Superleague. On 27 June 2017 he extended his contract for an additional season. On 21 January 2018 Karagiannis scored in a crucial 1–0 home win against Asteras Tripolis, the first after 3 months.

AO Chania Kissamikos
On 12 July 2018 he signed a one-year contract with Football League side AO Chania Kissamikos on a free transfer.

Return to Lamia
On 3 July 2019, he returned to Lamia on a one-year contract.

Career statistics

Club

References

External links
Player info @ Guardian.touch-line.com

1993 births
Living people
Greek footballers
Super League Greece players
Football League (Greece) players
Aris Thessaloniki F.C. players
PAS Lamia 1964 players
AO Chania F.C. players
Kozani F.C. players
Veria NFC players
Association football forwards
Sportspeople from Grevena
Footballers from Western Macedonia